On March 13, 1986, the American cruiser  and the destroyer , claiming the right of innocent passage, entered Soviet territorial waters in the Black Sea near the southern Crimean Peninsula. The warships passed within six miles of the Soviet coast, where they were soon confronted by the Soviet frigate . The commander of Ladny notified the U.S. warships that they had violated Soviet territorial waters and requested that they depart immediately. The U.S. warships confirmed receipt of the warning but did not change course. The Soviet command placed its Black Sea air and naval forces on combat readiness and dispatched border guard vessels and naval aircraft to intercept the U.S. warships.

Yorktown and Caron stayed in Soviet territorial waters for roughly two hours. The situation de-escalated when the U.S. ships left; diplomatic repercussions continued for several weeks.

Background 
"The Rules of Navigation and Sojourn of Foreign Warships in the Territorial Waters and Internal Waters and Ports of the USSR", enacted by the Soviet Council of Ministers in 1983, acknowledged the right of innocent passage of foreign warships only in restricted areas of Soviet territorial waters in the Baltic, Sea of Okhotsk and the Sea of Japan. There were no sea lanes for innocent passage in the Black Sea. The United States, starting from 1979, conducted a freedom of navigation program as the U.S. government believed that many countries were beginning to assert jurisdictional boundaries that far exceeded traditional claims. The program was implemented because diplomatic protests seemed ineffective. The U.S. actions in the Black Sea were challenged by the Soviet Union several times prior to the 1986 incident, particularly on December 9, 1968, August 1979 and on February 18, 1984.

Incident 
On March 10, 1986, the  USS Yorktown, accompanied by the  USS Caron, entered the Black Sea via the Turkish Straits. On March 13 with their main armament pointed in the direction of the Soviet coastline, Yorktown and Caron entered the Soviet territorial waters and sailed west along the southern Crimean Peninsula, approaching within  of the coast. Having entered from the direction of Feodosia, the US warships sailed for two hours and 21 minutes. Both American warships also confronted the Soviet border guard vessels Dozorny and Izmail. The commander of Ladny, Captain Zhuravlev, reported the incident to his superiors.

According to Izvestiya editor Vyacheslav Lukashin, at the time of the incident the Commander-in-Chief of the Soviet Navy Vladimir Chernavin knew that the order for the U.S. warships to proceed into Soviet waters was given by the U.S. Secretary of Defense Caspar Weinberger with the consent of President Ronald Reagan.

Aftermath

Soviet protest 
The Soviet Ministry of Foreign Affairs held two press conferences concerning the incident. The U.S. charge d'affaires, Richard Combs, was summoned to the Soviet Ministry of Foreign Affairs to receive the Soviet protest. The Soviet Union stated that the U.S. violation of its territorial waters "was of a demonstrative, defiant nature and pursued clearly provocative aims". Vladimir Chernavin affirmed that "the innocent passage of foreign warships through the territorial waters of the USSR is permitted only in specially authorized coastal areas which have been announced by the Soviet government [and] there are no such areas in the Black Sea off the coast of the Soviet Union".

U.S. stance 
Replying to the Soviet note verbale about the incident, the U.S. stated that "the transit of the USS Yorktown and USS Caron through the claimed Soviet territorial sea on March 13, 1986, was a proper exercise of the right of innocent passage, which international law, both customary and conventional, has long accorded ships of all states". The U.S. Department of State's instructions to the American embassy in the Soviet Union noted the U.S. "would not want to lend any validity to a Soviet position that their domestic law was at all relevant in determining U.S. navigational rights under international law". An article in the American Journal of International Law argued in 1987 that "the course of the American warships indicated on a map published in Izvestiia confirms that the passage of the vessels was a lateral one" and that "at no time did they take a course that could be construed as expressing an intention to enter the internal waters or ports of the USSR".

In the subsequent incident of 1988, the same USS Yorktown and USS Caron, while claiming innocent passage again in the Black Sea, were bumped by the Soviet vessels.

See also 
 1988 Black Sea bumping incident
 2003 Tuzla Island conflict
 2018 Kerch Strait incident
 2021 Black Sea incident

Notes

References 

1986 in international relations
1986 in the Soviet Union
Cold War military history of the Soviet Union
Cold War military history of the United States
International maritime incidents
Military history of the Black Sea
Maritime incidents in 1986
Cold War conflicts
Maritime incidents in the Soviet Union
Soviet Union–United States relations
1986 in Ukraine
Crimea in the Soviet Union